Michaelis–Gutmann bodies, (M-G bodies) are concentrically layered basophilic inclusions found in Hansemann cells in the urinary tract. They are 2 to 10 μm in diameter, and are thought to represent remnants of phagosomes mineralized by iron and calcium deposits.

M-G bodies are a pathognomonic feature of malakoplakia, an inflammatory condition that affects the genitourinary tract. They were discovered in 1902 by Leonor Michaelis and Carl Gutmann.

References 
 University of Chicago; Emerging Infections
 Who Named It? M-G bodies
 https://www.pathologyoutlines.com/topic/bladdermalakoplakia.html

Urinary system